Darren Everett Criss (born February 5, 1987) is an American actor, singer, and songwriter. He rose to fame starring on the television series Glee (2010–2015) and received Emmy and Golden Globe acting awards for his leading role as spree killer Andrew Cunanan in The Assassination of Gianni Versace: American Crime Story (2018). He has also appeared on Broadway and in film and has released several musical albums.

A founding member and co-owner of StarKid Productions, a musical theater company based in Chicago, Criss first garnered attention playing the lead role of Harry Potter in, and writing most of the music and lyrics for, StarKid's musical production of A Very Potter Musical. Criss has also starred on Broadway as a replacement in both How to Succeed in Business Without Really Trying and Hedwig and the Angry Inch. In 2015, Criss co-founded Elsie Fest which is touted as "New York City's first outdoor music festival celebrating tunes from the stage and screen".

In March 2017, Criss debuted his indie pop band Computer Games along with his brother Chuck Criss. In addition to his music endeavors, Criss starred in the second installment of Ryan Murphy's American Crime Story. Subtitled The Assassination of Gianni Versace (2018), Criss's portrayal of spree killer Andrew Cunanan received acclaim from critics, and earned him an Emmy win for Outstanding Lead Actor in a Limited Series or Movie and a Golden Globe Award for Best Actor – Miniseries, or Television Film.

Early life and education
Criss was born in San Francisco, California, the youngest child of Cerina and Charles William Criss, an investment banker and a patron of the arts. He had an older brother, Charles "Chuck" Criss, who was a member of the band Freelance Whales. Criss is Eurasian – his mother, a native of Cebu, Philippines, is of Chinese, Filipino and Spanish descent while his father, a native of Pittsburgh, Pennsylvania, was of English, German, and Irish descent. Criss was raised primarily in San Francisco, apart from 1988 to 1992, when the family resided in Honolulu, Hawaii, where his father started EastWest Bank, serving as chairman and CEO.

Criss attended Roman Catholic schools. He completed his elementary education at Stuart Hall for Boys, and later graduated from St. Ignatius College Preparatory in 2005. In 2009, Criss obtained his Bachelor of Fine Arts from the University of Michigan, majoring in Theater Performance and minoring in Musicology and Italian.

Musical and theatrical training

Criss' interest in music started in early childhood; at age five, he began taking violin lessons and was classically trained for the next fifteen years. Criss taught himself how to play other instruments, including guitar, piano, mandolin, harmonica, and drums. In high school, Criss immersed himself in music – he held the position of concertmaster in the school orchestra, he fronted his own band, and was voted "most likely to win a Grammy" by his peers. When he was fifteen, Criss began learning music composition and wrote his first song, which he later used as the title track of his first EP Human, released in 2009.

Criss also showed an interest for the performing arts. At age ten, he was accepted into the American Conservatory Theater (Young Conservatory program) where he studied theater performance throughout his formative years. At St Ignatius, he was a member of the performing arts program and acted in work, including, The Music Man, The Diary of Anne Frank, and Fiddler on the Roof. He was active as both an actor and director in the University of Michigan's student-run theater organization Basement Arts . In 2008, he spent a semester abroad studying Italian theater at the Accademia dell'Arte in Arezzo, Italy.

Career

1997–2009: Theatre debut, StarKids Productions
Criss made his professional stage debut at the age of ten as Cesario in 42nd Street Moon's production of Fanny (1997), then played Mauro in the Richard Rodgers and Stephen Sondheim musical Do I Hear a Waltz? (1998), and Beauregard Calhoun in Babes in Arms (1999). Throughout his adolescence, Criss appeared in a number of the American Conservatory Theater's plays, notably A Christmas Carol, A Midsummer Night's Dream, and The Voysey Inheritance.

At the University of Michigan, he performed in stage productions such as Pride and Prejudice, A Few Good Men, and The Cripple of Inishmaan. Criss began his solo music career while attending the University of Michigan. Playing in small venues, he developed his own musical repertoire which today consists of standards from the Great American Songbook, contemporary songs, Disney songs, and his own compositions. Criss started his television career with a five-episode arc playing the character of Josh Burton on Eastwick in 2009. The following year, he appeared in an episode of the series Cold Case.

Upon receiving his Bachelor of Fine Arts in 2009, Criss, along with some friends and classmates from the University of Michigan, co-founded StarKid Productions, a musical theater company. His most prominent acting role with StarKid has been that of Harry Potter in the musical comedies A Very Potter Musical, A Very Potter Sequel, and A Very Potter Senior Year (based on the Harry Potter series of novels by J. K. Rowling). Criss is credited as one of the primary songwriters and composers for StarKid Productions. He has contributed songs to A Very Potter Musical, Me and My Dick (which became the first-ever student-produced college musical to reach Billboard, debuting at number 11 on the Top Cast Albums chart), Little White Lie, and A Very Potter Senior Year. Subsequently, Criss solely composed all the songs and music for A Very Potter Sequel, its companion album A Very StarKid Album, and Starship, which landed at number one on the Billboard Top Cast Albums chart, and at number 134 on the Billboard 200 chart.

2010–2015: Breakthrough with Glee

Glee
Criss portrayed Blaine Anderson, on the Fox television series Glee. He made his first appearance in season two in the episode "Never Been Kissed", which aired on November 9, 2010. Blaine attended Dalton Academy and was lead singer of its glee club, The Dalton Academy Warblers. His first performance, "Teenage Dream" by Katy Perry, was featured on the soundtrack album Glee: The Music, Volume 4. It reached number eight on the Billboard Hot 100 in the week ending November 27, 2010, and number one on the Billboard Digital Songs chart. It was the best-selling song in the US that week, selling 214,000 copies, the largest figure for a Glee title. It was only the second US-certified gold single in the show's history.

Both Billboard Jillian Mapes and Erica Futterman of Rolling Stone deemed "Teenage Dream" the best song of "Never Been Kissed", the episode in which it featured. The New York Daily News Anthony Benigno gave the song an "A", and noted that it was "flawless" and improved on Perry's original. The performance was nominated for the Best Gay Moment of the Year and Favorite Music Video awards at the 2010 AfterElton.com Visibility Awards. A Billboard cover-feature on Criss noted that the performance "arguably ushered in the trend of more current pop hits being reworked by the [Glee] cast."

Later songs performed by Blaine and the Warblers became popular enough to warrant a Warbler soundtrack album, Glee: The Music Presents the Warblers. It debuted at No. 2 on the US Billboard 200 and No. 1 on Billboard Soundtracks chart, selling 86,000 copies in its first week. The Warbler tracks had sold over 1.3 million copies as singles by the time the album was released.

Blaine initially served as a friend and mentor for Kurt, the bullied gay member of the Warblers' rival glee club, New Directions. Chemistry between the two characters, combined with fan support for the potential couple, led series co-creator Ryan Murphy to pair them romantically onscreen. At the beginning of the third season, Blaine transfers to McKinley High and joins New Directions; concurrently, Criss was promoted from recurring guest star to the show's main cast. In the subsequent seasons, Blaine goes off to college and later returns to Dalton to become the vocal director of the Warblers. From May 21–July 3, 2011, Criss and the cast of Glee performed in Glee Live! In Concert!, touring the US, Canada, England, and Ireland. According to Billboard, it was the 16th most successful concert tour of 2011, grossing more than $40 million, with total attendance topping 485,000. All 40 dates sold out, including shows at Staples Center, Nassau Coliseum, and The O2 Arenas in London and Dublin.

In the final season, he marries his long-time love, Kurt. Discussing public response to his character, Criss stated that he particularly enjoyed comments from "people from parts of the world who are maybe not as exposed to certain ideologies", but had reconsidered their stance on relationships and human rights as a result of the Blaine and Kurt storyline. He called this response "phenomenal" and said, "I was a straight kid growing up in a very gay community and it's something that I've had to watch so many friends have to struggle with and have no place to go to identify in kind of a grander media culture. To be a small piece of that machine is incredibly wonderful." Criss composed "Rise" for the episode "The Rise and Fall of Sue Sylvester" and "This Time" for the series finale. Criss was nominated for a Primetime Emmy Award for Outstanding Original Music and Lyrics for writing "This Time".

Other work
On July 20, 2010, Criss released an independently produced EP called Human. Describing his album as "soul-folk" to Entertainment Weekly, it peaked at No. 17 on the Billboard Top Heatseekers Albums chart. On December 10, 2010, Criss became the 400,000th member of the American Society of Composers, Authors and Publishers (ASCAP). In April 2011, he signed with Sony Music Entertainment. He is in the process of recording a full-length studio album, with a release date yet to be determined.

In November 2011, Criss participated in StarKid's first national concert tour, The SPACE Tour, for the New York and Boston shows, and, in the summer of 2012, he joined them again for their second national tour, Apocalyptour, for the Los Angeles and New York shows.

In January 2012, Criss made his Broadway debut, replacing Daniel Radcliffe in the role of J. Pierrepont Finch in the revival of How to Succeed in Business Without Really Trying for a three-week engagement at the Al Hirschfeld Theatre. His stint there proved to be a success: apart from Daniel Radcliffe's final week, the musical had the three most lucrative weeks of its 11-month run with Criss in the lead role, grossing more than four million dollars. Criss made his feature film debut in the comedy Girl Most Likely. It premiered at the Toronto International Film Festival (TIFF) and was released nationwide on July 19, 2013. Previously titled Imogene, the film starred Kristen Wiig, Annette Bening, and Matt Dillon.

In January 2013, Criss performed for US President Barack Obama, First Lady Michelle Obama, and Vice President Joe Biden at the inaugural balls of the 57th Presidential Inauguration. During a benefit concert for public school arts on April 14, 2013, Criss was made an honorary member of Yale University's a cappella singing group The Whiffenpoofs. Criss' first solo music tour visited 17 cities in the United States, Canada, and France from May 29–June 30, 2013, and included songs from Glee, StarKid, his Human EP, and new material from his upcoming solo album.

2016–present: Continued success

Criss took on the role of Hedwig in Hedwig and the Angry Inch from April 29, 2015, to July 19, 2015, at the Belasco Theater. He headlined the national tour in San Francisco and Los Angeles, from October 2 to November 27, 2016.

In 2017, Criss reunited with Glee creator Ryan Murphy to portray serial killer Andrew Cunanan in the second season of Murphy's anthology series American Crime Story. His performance received acclaim from critics, and earned Criss a Primetime Emmy Award for Outstanding Lead Actor in a Limited Series or Movie. He also earned a Golden Globe Award for Best Performance by an Actor in a Limited Series or a Motion Picture Made for Television. Criss formed the indie pop band Computer Games with his brother, Chuck Criss the same year. Their first album, Lost Boys Life EP features four songs written by the duo. The lead single "Every Single Night" debuted at number two on Billboards Hot Singles Sales chart. In December 2017, Criss released a five-track solo EP titled Homework. The EP debuted atop the Billboard Heatseekers Chart and at number seven on Billboards Independent Albums chart.

On July 10, 2019, it was announced that Criss would be an actor, executive producer, and creator for Royalties, a new show on the streaming service Quibi. Criss is working with previous collaborators Matt and Nick Lang of Team StarKid, who are to co-write the series as well as executive produce. The show is scheduled to be released on June 1, 2020. On September 6, 2019, it was announced that Criss would be an actor and executive producer for Hollywood, released on Netflix on May 1, 2020. In October 2021, Criss portrayed The Caretaker in Muppets Haunted Mansion.

On October 8, 2021, Criss released his first Christmas-themed album through Decca Records. In December 2022, Criss went on a Christmas-themed tour across the U.S. with songs from the album.  From April 14 to July 10, 2022, he performed in the Broadway revival of David Mamet's American Buffalo alongside Sam Rockwell and Laurence Fishburne.

Media appearances
Criss has appeared on the magazine covers of Billboard, Entertainment Weekly, Out, Playbill, TV Guide, Da Man, GT, Prestige, and Essential Homme. Criss is featured in the fall ad campaign (2011) for Uniqlo, a Japanese clothing line. Criss was named one of Peoples Sexiest Men Alive (2011), and was ranked No. 1 on AfterElton's "Hot 100" list (2011 & 2012), and No. 1 on GQ "30 Under 30: The Most Stylish Young Men In Hollywood" list (2012).

Other projects
Criss is an investor and partner of The Motley, a California-based men's grooming e-tailer.

Criss is a co-founder of Elsie Fest, a music festival which features Broadway and pop music acts. The first annual show was held on September 27, 2015, in New York City.

Advocacy and charity work
Criss is an advocate for LGBT rights, and is an active supporter of The Trevor Project, the leading national organization focused on suicide prevention efforts among lesbian, gay, bisexual, transgender, queer, and questioning (LGBTQ) youth. Criss is the recipient of Variety Power of Youth Philanthropy award for his contributions to The Trevor Project.

Criss has been a spokesperson for various organizations, including Rock the Vote and the Foundation for New American Musicals.

Criss recorded the Bob Dylan song "New Morning", featuring his brother, Chuck Criss, for Amnesty International. It was part of the compilation album Chimes of Freedom: Songs of Bob Dylan Honoring 50 Years of Amnesty International, released on January 24, 2012.

Criss has performed at various charity benefits including American Conservatory Theater, AIDS Project Los Angeles, New Conservatory Theatre Center, Toys for Tots, City of Hope National Medical Center, Motion Picture & Television Fund, Public School Arts, MusiCares Foundation, The Old Vic, UCLA's Jonsson Comprehensive Cancer Center, Big Brothers Big Sisters of America, Young Storytellers Foundation, and the Elizabeth Glaser Pediatric AIDS Foundation.

Personal life
In January 2018, Criss announced he was engaged to Mia Swier, his girlfriend of seven and a half years. They married on February 16, 2019. In October 2021, they announced they were expecting their first child, a daughter born in April 2022.

Filmography

Film

Television

Theatre

Video games

Web

Musical performances 
{| class="wikitable"
|-
! scope="col" | Year
! scope="col" | Event
! scope="col" | Location
! scope="col" class="unsortable" | Notes
|-
| style="text-align:center;" |2010–2013 || Trevor Live || Los Angeles|| Benefit for The Trevor Project. In 2010, Criss sang "Not Alone" and "Teenage Dream" with Glee'''s Dalton Academy Warblers and Katy Perry, in 2011, he sang Tom Jones' hit, "It's Not Unusual", in 2012 he sang an acoustic version of Katy Perry's "Part of Me", and in 2013, he co-sang lead, with the cast of Glee, the Charlie Chaplin song '"Smile".
|-
| style="text-align:center;" |2011 ||MusiCares Person of the Year|| Los Angeles || Criss and Glees Dalton Academy Warblers performed for Barbra Streisand, in honor of her being named MusiCares Person of the Year by the MusiCares Foundation.
|-
| style="text-align:center;" |2011 ||Glee Live! In Concert!|| US, Canada, England & Ireland || The 16th most successful concert tour of 2011, grossing more than $40 million, with total attendance topping 485,000. All 40 dates sold out, including shows at Staples Center, Nassau Coliseum, and The O2 Arenas in London and Dublin.
|-
| style="text-align:center;" |2011 ||ASCAP Pop Music Awards || Los Angeles || Criss paid tribute to Rod Stewart by singing a ballad version of Stewart's song "Da Ya Think I'm Sexy?", while accompanying himself on piano.
|-
| style="text-align:center;" |2011 ||Billboard / Hollywood Reporter Film & TV Music Conference || Los Angeles|| Criss honored composer Alan Menken with a medley of his own Disney songs, singing alongside Broadway star Lea Salonga.
|-
| style="text-align:center;" |2011 ||The SPACE Tour|| New York & Boston ||StarKid Productions' first national concert tour. Majority of songs performed were written and composed by Criss.
|-
| style="text-align:center;" |2011 || Sing Out, Raise Hope, Benefit Concert || New York || Criss performed at Lincoln Center with the a cappella singing groups of Harvard University's Krokodiloes, Princeton University's Nassoons, and Yale University's The Whiffenpoofs, at a benefit concert for the Elizabeth Glaser Pediatric AIDS Foundation and The Trevor Project.
|-
| style="text-align:center;" |2012 ||E! Entertainment pre-Oscar Show || Los Angeles || Criss sang "The Rainbow Connection" with Kermit the Frog for the pre-show of the 84th Academy Awards.
|-
| style="text-align:center;" |2012 ||Apocalyptour||New York & Los Angeles||StarKid Productions' second national concert tour.
|-
| style="text-align:center;" |2012 || Fundraiser for Barack Obama||Los Angeles||Criss performed for the President of the United States at an LGBT-sponsored campaign fundraising gala.
|-
| style="text-align:center;" |2013 ||57th Presidential Inauguration||Washington, D.C.|| 
Kids' Inaugural Concert, hosted by First Lady Michelle Obama and Second Lady Dr. Jill Biden – Criss sang his own song "Not Alone", joined by the Soul Children of Chicago choir. He also accompanied Naya Rivera on guitar as she sang the hit "Valerie".
Vice President Joe Biden Inaugural event – Criss sang "Teenage Dream" and Carole King's "One Fine Day".
The Presidential Inaugural Ball – Criss performed the Disney song "When You Wish Upon A Star".
|-
| style="text-align:center;" |2013|| Listen Up Tour||US, Canada & France||Criss headlined his first solo music tour, which visited 18 cities from May 29–June 30. The set included songs from Glee, StarKid, his Human EP, and new material from his upcoming solo album.
|-
| style="text-align:center;" |2013||A Capitol Fourth||Washington, D.C.||Criss co-headlined the 4th of July celebration concert on the National Mall.
|-
| style="text-align:center;" |2014||Michael Feinstein's New Year's Eve at the Rainbow Room|| New York|| Criss co-sang with Michael Feinstein a medley of Frank Sinatra songs.
|-
| style="text-align:center;" |2016||Broadway Today with Darren Criss and Betsy Wolfe||Washington, D.C., N.Y.C. & Toronto||Criss co-headlined with Betsy Wolfe a Broadway-themed concert tour, accompanied by the National Symphony Orchestra, conducted by Steven Reineke. Performances were held at The Kennedy Center, Carnegie Hall, and Roy Thomson Hall.
|-
| style="text-align:center;" |2016|| The Little Mermaid in Concert||Los Angeles||Criss co-headlined the concert at the Hollywood Bowl, playing the part of "Prince Eric".
|-
| colspan="4" style="text-align:center;" | * Note: This is a selection of Criss' musical performances, not a complete list.
|}

Discography
Solo
A Very Darren Crissmas (2021)

EPs
Human (2010)
Homework (2017)
Masquerade (2021)

Glee albums

Glee: The Music, The Christmas Album (2010)
Glee: The Music, Volume 4 (2010)
Glee: The Music, Volume 5 (2011)
Glee: The Music Presents the Warblers (2011)
Glee: The Music, Volume 6 (2011)
Glee: The 3D Concert Movie (2011)
Glee: The Music, The Christmas Album Volume 2 (2011)
Glee: The Music, Volume 7 (2011)
Glee: The Music, The Graduation Album (2012)
Glee: The Music, Season 4, Volume 1 (2012)
Glee: The Music, The Christmas Album Volume 3 (2012)
Glee Sings the Beatles (2013)
Glee: The Music – Celebrating 100 Episodes (2013)StarKid Productions albumsLittle White Lie (2009)
A Very Potter Musical (2009)
Me and My Dick (A New Musical) (2010)
A Very StarKid Album (2010)
A Very Potter Sequel (2010)
Starship (2011)
The SPACE Tour (2012)
Apocalyptour (2012)
A Very StarKid Senior Year (2012)Independent songs"Skin and Bones" – Duet with Charlene Kaye – Things I Will Need in the Past (album) (2008)
"Dress and Tie" – Duet with Charlene Kaye (2011)
"New Morning" – Chimes of Freedom: Songs of Bob Dylan Honoring 50 Years of Amnesty International (album) (2012)Computer GamesLost Boys Life (2017)Music videos'"Skin and Bones" – Charlene Kaye (2009)
"Magnolia Wine" – Charlene Kaye (2009)
"Roll with Me" – Montgomery Gentry (2009)
'"Dress and Tie" – Charlene Kaye (2011)
"Last Friday Night (T.G.I.F.)" – Katy Perry (2011)
"New Morning" – Amnesty International (2012)
"Dress You Up" – Vogue "Fashion Night Out" (2012)
"Kangaroo Court" – Capital Cities (2013)
"Songify the News 3" — The Gregory Brothers (2013)
"I Sold My Bed, But Not My Stereo" – Capital Cities (2014)
"Already Home" — A Great Big World (2014)
"Anthem" — Phantom Planet featuring Darren Criss (2020)

Tours
 Glee Live! In Concert! Listen Up Tour (2013)
 LM/DC Tour'' (with Lea Michele) (2018)

Awards and nominations

References

External links

 (archive)

1987 births
20th-century American male actors
21st-century American male actors
Male actors from San Francisco
American male voice actors
American Internet celebrities
American male singer-songwriters
American singer-songwriters
American tenors
American multi-instrumentalists
American people of English descent
American people of German descent
American people of Irish descent
American people of Spanish descent
American male actors of Filipino descent
American male actors of Chinese descent
American male child actors
American male film actors
American male stage actors
American male television actors
American male musical theatre actors
Businesspeople from San Francisco
HIV/AIDS activists
American LGBT rights activists
Living people
StarKid Productions members
University of Michigan School of Music, Theatre & Dance alumni
Best Miniseries or Television Movie Actor Golden Globe winners
Emmy Award winners
Outstanding Performance by a Lead Actor in a Miniseries or Movie Primetime Emmy Award winners
Outstanding Performance by a Male Actor in a Miniseries or Television Movie Screen Actors Guild Award winners